Orthetrum ransonnetii, the desert skimmer or Ransonnet's skimmer, is a wide spread dragonfly species from Africa and the Middle East.

It is an oasis species in Northern West Africa and found in desert mountain areas of Western Sahara, Sudan, Niger, Chad, Algeria, Iran, Israel, Jordan, Egypt. It is also found in Arabia, especially in United Arab Emirates  and Oman very commonly in Wadis.

References

Libellulidae